In mathematics, scalar multiplication is one of the basic operations defining a vector space in linear algebra (or more generally, a module in abstract algebra). In common geometrical contexts, scalar multiplication of a real Euclidean vector by a positive real number multiplies the magnitude of the vector—without changing its direction. The term "scalar" itself derives from this usage: a scalar is that which scales vectors. Scalar multiplication is the multiplication of a vector by a scalar (where the product is a vector), and is to be distinguished from inner product of two vectors (where the product is a scalar).

Definition
In general, if K is a field and V is a vector space over K, then scalar multiplication is a function from K × V to V.
The result of applying this function to k in K and v in V is denoted kv.

Properties

Scalar multiplication obeys the following rules (vector in boldface):
 Additivity in the scalar: (c + d)v = cv + dv;
 Additivity in the vector: c(v + w) = cv + cw;
 Compatibility of product of scalars with scalar multiplication: (cd)v = c(dv);
 Multiplying by 1 does not change a vector: 1v = v;
 Multiplying by 0 gives the zero vector: 0v = 0;
 Multiplying by −1 gives the additive inverse: (−1)v = −v.
Here, + is addition either in the field or in the vector space, as appropriate; and 0 is the additive identity in either.
Juxtaposition indicates either scalar multiplication or the multiplication operation in the field.

Interpretation

Scalar multiplication may be viewed as an external binary operation or as an action of the field on the vector space. A geometric interpretation of scalar multiplication is that it stretches or contracts vectors by a constant factor. As a result, it produces a vector in the same or opposite direction of the original vector but of a different length.

As a special case, V may be taken to be K itself and scalar multiplication may then be taken to be simply the multiplication in the field.

When V is Kn, scalar multiplication is equivalent to multiplication of each component with the scalar, and may be defined as such.

The same idea applies if K is a commutative ring and V is a module over K.
K can even be a rig, but then there is no additive inverse.
If K is not commutative, the distinct operations left scalar multiplication cv and right scalar multiplication vc may be defined.

Scalar multiplication of matrices 

explicitly:

Similarly, even though there is no widely-accepted definition, the right scalar multiplication of a matrix  with a scalar  could be defined to be

explicitly:

When the entries of the matrix and the scalars are from the same commutative field, for example, the real number field or the complex number field, these two multiplications are the same, and can be simply called scalar multiplication. For matrices over a more general field that is not commutative, they may not be equal.

For a real scalar and matrix:

For quaternion scalars and matrices:

where  are the quaternion units.

See also

Dot product
Matrix multiplication
Multiplication of vectors
Product (mathematics)

References

Linear algebra
Abstract algebra
Multiplication